Đỗ Mỹ Linh (born 13 October 1996) is a Vietnamese model and beauty pageant titleholder who won Miss Vietnam 2016. She represented Vietnam at the Miss World 2017.

Personal life
Linh was born in Hanoi. She is a student of Foreign Trade University. She is married to Đỗ Vinh Quang, who is the Chairman of Hanoi FC. The wedding took place on October 23rd, 2022.

Pageantry

Miss Universe Vietnam 2015
Linh competed in Miss Universe Vietnam 2015 and was placed in Top 15.

Miss Vietnam 2016
Linh was crowned Miss Vietnam 2016. She was then appointed by Sen Vàng Entertainment and Elite - the national license holder to represent Vietnam at Miss World 2017 in China.

Miss World 2017
Linh represented Vietnam at Miss World 2017 in Sanya, China and placed in the Top 40 thanks to winning the Head to Head challenge (Group 18). She became a semifinalist in the People's Choice and Multimedia competitions and was the first ever contestant from Vietnam to win the Beauty with a Purpose competition.

References

External links

1996 births
Living people
21st-century Vietnamese women
Miss World 2017 delegates
Miss Vietnam winners
People from Hanoi
The Amazing Race contestants
Vietnamese female models
Vietnamese beauty pageant winners